The abbreviation CTOT can mean:

 The Canadian Trade Office in Taipei
 In aviation, a Calculated Take-Off Time. See Air traffic flow management.
 Constant Torque On Take-off